The Mozart Brothers is a 1986 Swedish comedy film directed by Suzanne Osten. Osten won the award for Best Director at the 22nd Guldbagge Awards. The murder of Swedish Prime Minister Olof Palme took place as Palme was walking home from the cinema after watching the film on 28 February 1986.

Plot
The film depicts an unconventional opera director, Walter (Etienne Glaser), who is directing a production of Mozart's Don Giovanni at the Stockholm Opera. He attempts to overthrow many of the conventions of opera; he gives certain solo numbers to the opera chorus, he involves the orchestra in the acting, and he wants to fill the stage with damp earth to simulate a graveyard. The singers, the members of the orchestra, and the staff at the opera house are initially very antagonistic to his plans, especially his appeal to their eroticism as individuals. However, they reluctantly agree to do things Walter's way, and gradually come over to his point of view.  Throughout the film, Mozart's ghost is glimpsed more and more frequently, at one point seen weeping with joy at the effect his work has had. The film ends with the premiere of the production being a resounding success, and the performers taking the credit for this, with the director largely forgotten.

Cast
 Etienne Glaser as Walter
 Philip Zandén as Flemming
 Henry Bronett as Fritz
 Loa Falkman as Eskil / Don Juan
 Agneta Ekmanner as Marian / Donna Elvira
 Lena T. Hansson as Ia / Donna Anna
 Helge Skoog as Olof / Don Ottavio
 Grith Fjeldmose as Therés / Zerlina
 Rune Zetterström as Lennart / Leporello
 Niklas Ek as Georg / Donna Anna's Father
 Krister St. Hill as Ulf / Mazzetto

References

External links
 
 

1986 films
1986 comedy films
Swedish comedy films
1980s Swedish-language films
Films whose director won the Best Director Guldbagge Award
Films directed by Suzanne Osten
1980s Swedish films